Pilosocereus colombianus is a species of Pilosocereus found in Valle del Cauca Department, Colombia and Azuay, El Oro, Guayas, Loja, Manabí, 
and Santa Elena Provinces of Ecuador

References

External links

colombianus
Flora of Ecuador
Flora of Colombia